The 60th district of the Texas House of Representatives contains the entirety of Palo Pinto, Parker, and Stephens counties. The current Representative is Glenn Rogers, who was first elected in 2020.

References 

60